Ashby Folville Manor is a late 19th-century house in Neo-Tudor style in the village of Ashby Folville, Leicestershire. The house was substantially rebuilt in 1891-1893 by the architect John Ely of Manchester after a fire.

A camp for displaced people from Poland was established in a former US Army base in the grounds after World War II. The resettlement camp was occupied from 1948 until 1965.

From 2004 - 2016 it was the home of Rosemary Conley.<ref>[http://www.thisisleicestershire.co.uk/Conley-s-concert-raises-money-good-causes/story-13224704-detail/story.html "Conley's concert raises money for good causes" Leicester Mercury, 29 Aug 2011]</ref>

Notes and references

Sources
 Pevsner, Nikolaus (1960). The Buildings of England: Leicestershire and Rutland'' (Harmondsworth: Penguin Books)

Country houses in Leicestershire